Johann Jakob Fried (21 April 1689, Strasbourg – 3 September 1769, Strasbourg) was a German obstetrician. He is sometimes referred to as the "Father of German midwifery". His son, Georg Albrecht Fried (1736-1773), was also a noted obstetrician.

In 1710 he obtained his doctorate from the University of Strasbourg with a dissertation thesis titled ""De cordis palpitatione". From 1728 onward, he was director of the Prätor Franz Josef von Klinglin municipal midwifery school in Strasbourg, a popular school that attracted students from throughout Europe. He was considered an excellent teacher, and he played a major role during the advent of scientific obstetrics in Germany. Among his better known pupils was future Göttingen professor, Johann Georg Roederer.

Works associated with Johann Jakob Fried 
 "Praelectiones materiae medicae D.D. Paul. Hermanni ... / Pensum IV." (as contributor), 1709.
 "Gravidarum urinae suppressio, non remidiis internis, sed catheteris adplicatione, unicae curanda", in: Acta physico-medica Ac. Caesareae Leopoldino-Carolinae, ebd. 1742, S. 422-25.
 "La vie et l'œuvre François Mauriceau : introduction de ses idées en Alsace au XVIIIeme siecle par Johann Jakob Fried et son fils Georg Albrecht", by Bénédicte Marie Catherine Luff, Strasbourg, 1983.

References

1689 births
1769 deaths
University of Strasbourg alumni
Physicians from Strasbourg
German obstetricians
Alsatian-German people